Cotton Mather  (February 12, 1663 – February 13, 1728) was a New England Puritan clergyman and writer.  Educated at Harvard College, in 1685 he joined his father Increase as minister of the Congregationalist Old North Meeting House of Boston, where he continued to preach for the rest of his life.

A major intellectual and public figure in English-speaking colonial America, Cotton Mather helped lead the successful revolt of 1689 against Sir Edmund Andros, the governor imposed on New England by King James II. Mather's subsequent involvement in the Salem witch trials of 1692–1693, which he defended in the book Wonders of the Invisible World (1693), attracted intense controversy in his own day and has negatively affected his historical reputation.  As a historian of colonial New England, Mather is noted for his Magnalia Christi Americana (1702).

Personally and intellectually committed to the waning social and religious orders in New England, Cotton Mather unsuccessfully sought the presidency of Harvard College, an office that had been held by his father Increase, another significant Puritan clergyman and intellectual.  After 1702, Cotton Mather clashed with Joseph Dudley, the governor of the Province of Massachusetts Bay, whom Mather attempted unsuccessfully to drive out of power.  Mather championed the new Yale College as an intellectual bulwark of Puritanism in New England.  He corresponded extensively with European intellectuals and received an honorary Doctor of Divinity degree from the University of Glasgow in 1710.

A promoter of the new experimental science in America, Cotton Mather carried out original research on plant hybridization and on the use of inoculation as a means of preventing smallpox contagion.  He dispatched many reports on scientific matters to the Royal Society of London, which elected him as a fellow in 1713.  Mather's promotion of inoculation against smallpox, which he had learned about from an African named Onesimus whom Mather held as a slave, caused violent controversy in Boston during the outbreak of 1721.  Scientist and US founding father Benjamin Franklin, who as a young Bostonian had opposed the old Puritan order represented by Mather and participated in the anti-inoculation campaign, later described Mather's book Bonifacius, or Essays to Do Good (1710) as a major influence on his life.

Early life and education

Cotton Mather was born in 1663 in the city of Boston, the capital of the Massachusetts Bay Colony, to the Rev. Increase Mather and his wife Maria née Cotton.  His grandfathers were Richard Mather and John Cotton, both of them prominent Puritan ministers who had played major roles in the establishment and growth of the Massachusetts colony.  Richard Mather was a graduate of the University of Oxford and John Cotton a graduate of the University of Cambridge.  Increase Mather was a graduate of Harvard College and the University of Dublin, and served as the minister of Boston's original North Church (not to be confused with the Anglican Old North Church of Paul Revere fame).  This was one of the two principal Congregationalist churches in the city, the other being the First Church established by John Winthrop.  Cotton Mather was therefore born into one of the most influential and intellectually distinguished families in colonial New England and seemed destined to follow his father and grandfathers into the Puritan clergy.

Cotton entered Harvard College, in the neighboring town of Cambridge, in 1674.  Aged only eleven and a half, he is the youngest student ever admitted to that institution.  At around this time, Cotton began to be afflicted by stuttering, a speech disorder that he would struggle to overcome throughout the rest of his life.  Bullied by the older students and fearing that his stutter would make him unsuitable as a preacher, Cotton withdrew temporarily from the College, continuing his education at home.  He also took an interest in medicine and considered the possibility of pursuing a career as a physician rather than as a religious minister.  Cotton eventually returned to Harvard and received his Bachelor of Arts degree in 1678, followed by a Master of Arts degree in 1681.

After completing his education, Cotton joined his father's church as assistant pastor.  In 1685, Cotton was ordained and assumed full responsibilities as co-pastor of the church.  Father and son continued to share responsibility for the care of the congregation until the death of Increase in 1723.  Cotton would die less than five years after his father, and was therefore throughout most of his career in the shadow of the respected and formidable Increase.

Increase Mather eventually became president of Harvard and exercised considerable influence on the politics of the Massachusetts colony.  Despite Cotton's efforts, he never became quite as influential as his father.  One of the most public displays of their strained relationship emerged during the Salem witch trials, which Increase Mather reportedly did not support.  Cotton did surpass his father's output as a writer, producing nearly 400 works.

Personal life

Cotton Mather married Abigail Phillips, daughter of Colonel John Phillips of Charlestown, on May 4, 1686, when Cotton was twenty-three and Abigail was not quite sixteen years old. They had nine children. Abigail, the couple's newborn twins, and a two-year-old daughter all succumbed to a measles epidemic in 1702. He married widow Elizabeth Hubbard in 1703. Like his first marriage, he was happily married to a very religious and emotionally stable woman. They had six children. Elizabeth died in their tenth year of marriage.

On July 5, 1715, Mather married widow Lydia Lee George. Her daughter Katherine, wife of Nathan Howell, became a widow shortly after Lydia married Mather and she came to live with the newly married couple. Also living in the Mather household at that time were Mather's children Abigal (21), Hannah (18), Elizabeth (11), and Samuel (9). Initially, Mather wrote in his journal how lovely he found his wife and how much he enjoyed their discussions about scripture. Within a few years of their marriage, Lydia was subject to rages which left Mather humiliated and depressed. They clashed over Mather's piety and his mishandling of Nathan Howell's estate. He began to call her deranged. She left him for ten days, returning when she learned that Mather's son Increase was lost at sea. Lydia nursed him through illnesses, the last of which lasted five weeks and ended with his death on February 15, 1728. Of the children that Mather had with Abigail and Elizabeth, the only children to survive him were Hannah and Samuel. He did not have any children with Lydia.

Revolt of 1689 

On May 14, 1686, ten days after Cotton Mather's marriage to Abigail Phillips, Edward Randolph disembarked in Boston bearing letters patent from King James II of England that revoked the Charter of the Massachusetts Bay Company and commissioned Randolph to reorganize the colonial government.  James's intention was to curb Massachusetts's religious separatism by incorporating the colony it into a larger Dominion of New England, without an elected legislature and under a governor who would serve at the pleasure of the Crown.  Later that year, the King appointed Sir Edmund Andros as governor of that new Dominion.  This was a direct attack upon the Puritan religious and social orders that the Mathers represented, as well as upon the local autonomy of Massachusetts.  The colonists were particularly outraged when Andros declared that all grants of land made in the name of the old Massachusetts Bay Company were invalid, forcing them to apply and pay for new royal patents on land that they already occupied or face eviction.  In April 1687, Increase Mather sailed to London, where he remained for the next four years, pleading with the Court for what he regarded as the interests of the Massachusetts colony.

The birth of a male heir to King James in June 1688, which could have cemented a Roman Catholic dynasty in the English throne, triggered the so-called Glorious Revolution in which Parliament deposed James and gave the Crown jointly to his Protestant daughter Mary and her husband, the Dutch Prince William of Orange.  News of the events in London greatly emboldened the opposition in Boston to Governor Andros, finally precipitating the 1689 Boston revolt.  Cotton Mather, then aged twenty-six, was one of the Puritan ministers who guided resistance in Boston to Andros's regime.  Early in 1689, Randolph had a warrant issued for Cotton Mather's arrest on a charge of "scandalous libel", but the warrant was overruled by Wait Winthrop.

According to some sources, Cotton Mather escaped a second attempted arrest on April 18, 1689, the same day that the people of Boston took up arms against Andros.  The young Mather may have authored, in whole or in part, the "Declaration of the Gentlemen, Merchants, and Inhabitants of Boston and the Country Adjacent", which justified that uprising by a list of grievances that the declaration attributed to the deposed officials.  The authorship of that document is uncertain: it was not signed by Mather or any other clergymen, and Puritans frowned upon the clergy being seen to play too direct and personal a hand in political affairs.  That day, Mather probably read the Declaration to a crowd gathered in front of the Boston Town House.

In July, Andros, Randolph, Joseph Dudley, and other officials who had been deposed and arrested in the Boston revolt were summoned to London to answer the complaints against them.  The administration of Massachusetts was temporarily assumed by Simon Bradstreet, whose rule proved weak and contentious.  In 1691, the government of King William and Queen Mary issued a new Massachusetts Charter.  This charter united the Massachusetts Bay Colony with Plymouth Colony into the new Province of Massachusetts Bay.  Rather than restoring the old Puritan rule, the Charter of 1691 mandated religious toleration for all non-Catholics and established a government led by a Crown-appointed governor.  The first governor under the new charter was Sir William Phips, who was a member of the Mathers' church in Boston.

Salem witch trials of 1692, the Mather influence

Pre-trials
In 1689, Mather published Memorable Providences detailing the supposed afflictions of several children in the Goodwin family in Boston. Mather had a prominent role in the witchcraft case against Catholic washerwoman Goody Glover, which ultimately resulted in her conviction and execution. Besides praying for the children, which also included fasting and meditation, he would also observe and record their activities. The children were subject to hysterical fits, which he detailed in Memorable Providences. In his book, Mather argued that since there are witches and devils, there are "immortal souls." He also claimed that witches appear spectrally as themselves. He opposed any natural explanations for the fits; he believed that people who confessed to using witchcraft were sane; he warned against performing magic due to its connection with the devil.

Robert Calef was a contemporary of Mather and critical of him, and he considered this book responsible for laying the groundwork for the Salem witch trials three years later:

Nineteenth-century historian Charles Wentworth Upham shared the view that the afflicted in Salem were imitating the Goodwin children, but he put the blame on both Cotton and his father Increase Mather:

Cambridge Association of ministers

In 1690, Cotton Mather played a primary role in forming a new ministers club called the Cambridge Association.  Their first order of business was to respond to a letter from the pastor of Salem Village (Samuel Parris). A second meeting was planned a week later in the college library and Parris was invited to travel down to Cambridge to meet with them, which he did. 
Throughout 1692, this association of powerful ministers were often queried for their opinion on Christian doctrine relative to witchcraft.

The court of Oyer and Terminer
In 1692, Cotton Mather claimed to have been industrious and influential in the direction of things at Salem from the beginning (see Sept. 2 1692 letter to Stoughton below). But it remains unknown how much of a role he had in the formation or construction of the Court of Oyer and Terminer at the end of May or what the original intent for this court may have been. Sir William Phips, governor of the newly chartered Province of Massachusetts Bay, signed an order forming the new court and allowed his lieutenant governor, William Stoughton, to become the court's chief justice. According to George Bancroft, Mather had been influential in gaining the politically unpopular Stoughton his appointment as lieutenant governor under Phips through the intervention of Mather's own politically powerful father, Increase. "Intercession had been made by Cotton Mather for the advancement of Stoughton, a man of cold affections, proud, self-willed and covetous of distinction." Apparently Mather saw in Stoughton, a bachelor who had never wed, an ally for church-related matters. Bancroft quotes Mather's reaction to Stoughton's appointment as follows: '"The time for a favor is come", exulted Cotton Mather; "Yea, the set time is come."'

Just prior to the first session of the new court, Mather wrote a lengthy essay which was copied and distributed to the judges. One of Mather's recommendations, invasive bodily searches for witch-marks, took place for the first time only days later, on June 2, 1692. Mather claimed not to have personally attended any sessions of the court of Oyer and Terminer (although his father attended the trial of George Burroughs). His contemporaries Calef and Thomas Brattle do place him at the executions (see below). Mather began to publicize and celebrate the trials well before they were put to an end: "If in the midst of the many Dissatisfaction among us, the publication of these Trials may promote such a pious Thankfulness unto God, for Justice being so far executed among us, I shall Re-joyce that God is Glorified." Mather called himself a historian rather than an advocate but, according to one modern writer, his writing largely presumes the guilt of the accused and includes such comments as calling Martha Carrier "a rampant hag". Mather referred to George Burroughs as a "very puny man" whose "tergiversations, contradictions, and falsehoods" made his testimony not "worth considering".

The use of so-called "spectral evidence"
The afflicted girls claimed that the semblance of a defendant, invisible to any but themselves, was tormenting them; it was greatly contested whether this should be considered evidence, but for the Court of Oyer and Terminer decided to allow it, despite the defendant's denial and profession of strongly held Christian beliefs. In his May 31, 1692 essay to the judges (see photo above), Mather expressed his support of the prosecutions, but also included some words of caution; "do not lay more stress on pure spectral evidence than it will bear … It is very certain that the Devils have sometimes represented the shapes of persons not only innocent, but also very virtuous. Though I believe that the just God then ordinarily provides a way for the speedy vindication of the persons thus abused."

Return of the Ministers
 
An opinion on the trials was sought from the ministers of the area in mid June. In an anonymous work written years later, Cotton Mather took credit for being the scribe: "drawn up at their desire, by Cotton Mather the younger, as I have been informed." The "Return of the Several Ministers" ambivalently discussed whether or not to allow spectral evidence.  The original full version of the letter was reprinted in late 1692 in the final two pages of Increase Mather's Cases of Conscience. It is a curious document and remains a source of confusion and argument. Calef calls it "perfectly ambidexter, giving as great as greater encouragement to proceed in those dark methods, then cautions against them… indeed the Advice then given, looks most like a thing of his composing, as carrying both fire to increase and water to quench the conflagration." It seems likely that the "Several" ministers consulted did not agree, and thus Cotton Mather's careful construction and presentation of the advice, sent from Boston to Salem, could have been crucial to its interpretation (see photos). 

Thomas Hutchinson summarized the Return, "The two first and the last sections of this advice took away the force of all the others, and the prosecutions went on with more vigor than before." Reprinting the Return five years later in his anonymously published Life of Phips (1697), Cotton Mather omitted the fateful "two first and the last" sections, though they were the ones he had already given most attention in his "Wonders of the Invisible World" rushed into publication in the summer and early autumn of 1692.

Pushing forward the August 19 executions
On August 19, 1692, Mather attended the execution of George Burroughs (and four others who were executed after Mather spoke) and Robert Calef presents him as playing a direct and influential role:

On September 2, 1692, after eleven of the accused had been executed, Cotton Mather wrote a letter to Chief Justice William Stoughton congratulating him on "extinguishing of as wonderful a piece of devilism as has been seen in the world" and claiming that "one half of my endeavors to serve you have not been told or seen."

Regarding spectral evidence, Upham concludes that "Cotton Mather never in any public writing 'denounced the admission' of it, never advised its absolute exclusion; but on the contrary recognized it as a ground of 'presumption' … [and once admitted] nothing could stand against it. Character, reason, common sense, were swept away." In a letter to an English clergyman in 1692, Boston intellectual Thomas Brattle, criticizing the trials, said of the judges' use of spectral evidence:

The later exclusion of spectral evidence from trials by Governor Phips, around the same time his own wife's (Lady Mary Phips) name coincidentally started being bandied about in connection with witchcraft, began in January 1693. This immediately brought about a sharp decrease in convictions. Due to a reprieve by Phips, there were no further executions. Phips's actions were vigorously opposed by William Stoughton.

Bancroft notes that Mather considered witches "among the poor, and vile, and ragged beggars upon Earth", and Bancroft asserts that Mather considered the people against the witch trials to be witch advocates.

Post-trials
In the years after the trials, of the principal actors in the trial, whose lives are recorded after, neither he nor Stoughton admitted strong misgivings. For several years after the trials, Cotton Mather continued to defend them and seemed to hold out a hope for their return.

Wonders of the Invisible World contained a few of Mather's sermons, the conditions of the colony and a description of witch trials in Europe. He somewhat clarified the contradictory advice he had given in Return of the Several Ministers, by defending the use of spectral evidence. Wonders of the Invisible World appeared around the same time as Increase Mather's Cases of Conscience.

Mather did not sign his name or support his father's book initially:

The last major events in Mather's involvement with witchcraft were his interactions with Mercy Short in December 1692 and Margaret Rule in September 1693. The latter brought a five year campaign by Boston merchant Robert Calef against the influential and powerful Mathers. Calef's book More Wonders of the Invisible World was inspired by the fear that Mather would succeed in once again stirring up new witchcraft trials, and the need to bear witness to the horrible experiences of 1692. He quotes the public apologies of the men on the jury and one of the judges. Increase Mather was said to have publicly burned Calef's book in Harvard Yard around the time he was removed from the head of the college and replaced by Samuel Willard.

Poole vs. Upham
Charles Wentworth Upham wrote Salem Witchcraft Volumes I and II With an Account of Salem Village and a History of Opinions on Witchcraft and Kindred Subjects, which runs to almost 1,000 pages. It came out in 1867 and cites numerous criticisms of Mather by Robert Calef.

William Frederick Poole defended Mather from these criticisms.

In 1869, Poole quoted from various school textbooks of the time demonstrating they were in agreement on Cotton Mather's role in the Witch Trial

If anyone imagines that we are stating the case too strongly, let him try an experiment with the first bright boy he meets by asking,...
'Who got up Salem Witchcraft?'... he will reply, 'Cotton Mather'. Let him try another boy...
'Who was Cotton Mather?' and the answer will come, 'The man who was on horseback, and hung witches.'

Poole was a librarian, and a lover of literature, including Mather's Magnalia "and other books and tracts, numbering nearly 400 [which] were never so prized by collectors as today." Poole announced his intention to redeem Mather's name, using as a springboard a harsh critique of Upham's book, via his own book Cotton Mather and Salem witchcraft. A quick search of the name Mather in Upham's book (referring to either father, son, or ancestors) shows that it occurs 96 times. Poole's critique runs less than 70 pages but the name "Mather" occurs many more times than the other book, which is more than ten times as long. Upham shows a balanced and complicated view of Cotton Mather, such as this first mention: "One of Cotton Mather's most characteristic productions is the tribute to his venerated master. It flows from a heart warm with gratitude."

Upham's book refers to Robert Calef no fewer than 25 times with the majority of these regarding documents compiled by Calef in the mid-1690s and stating: "Although zealously devoted to the work of exposing the enormities connected with the witchcraft prosecutions, there is no ground to dispute the veracity of Calef as to matters of fact." He goes on to say that Calef's collection of writings "gave a shock to Mather's influence, from which it never recovered."

Calef produced only the one book; he is self-effacing and apologetic for his limitations, and on the title page he is listed not as author but "collector". Poole, champion of literature, could not accept Calef whose "faculties, as indicated by his writings appear to us to have been of an inferior order;…", and his book "in our opinion, has a reputation much beyond its merits." Poole refers to Calef as Mather's "personal enemy" and opens a line, "Without discussing the character and motives of Calef…" but does not follow up on this suggestive comment to discuss any actual or purported motive or reason to impugn Calef. Upham responded to Poole (referring to Poole as "the Reviewer") in a book running five times as long and sharing the same title but with the clauses reversed: Salem Witchcraft and Cotton Mather. Many of Poole's arguments were addressed, but both authors emphasize the importance of Cotton Mather's difficult and contradictory view on spectral evidence, as copied in the final pages, called "The Return of Several Ministers", of Increase Mather's "Cases of Conscience".

The debate continues: Kittredge vs. Burr
Evidenced by the published opinion in the years that followed the Poole vs Upham debate, it would seem Upham was considered the clear winner (see Sibley, GH Moore, WC Ford, and GH Burr below.).  In 1891, Harvard English professor Barrett Wendall wrote Cotton Mather, The Puritan Priest.  His book often expresses agreement with Upham but also announces an intention to show Cotton Mather in a more positive light. "[Cotton Mather] gave utterance to many hasty things not always consistent with fact or with each other…" And some pages later: "[Robert] Calef's temper was that of the rational Eighteenth century; the Mathers belonged rather to the Sixteenth, the age of passionate religious enthusiasm."

In 1907, George Lyman Kittredge published an essay that would become foundational to a major change in the 20th-century view of witchcraft and Mather culpability therein. Kittredge is dismissive of Robert Calef, and sarcastic toward Upham, but shows a fondness for Poole and a similar soft touch toward Cotton Mather. Responding to Kittredge in 1911, George Lincoln Burr, a historian at Cornell, published an essay that begins in a professional and friendly fashion toward both Poole and Kittredge, but quickly becomes a passionate and direct criticism, stating that Kittredge in the "zeal of his apology… reached results so startlingly new, so contradictory of what my own lifelong study in this field has seemed to teach, so unconfirmed by further research… and withal so much more generous to our ancestors than I can find it in my conscience to deem fair, that I should be less than honest did I not seize this earliest opportunity share with you the reasons for my doubts…". (In referring to "ancestors" Burr primarily means the Mathers, as is made clear in the substance of the essay.) The final paragraph of Burr's 1911 essay pushes these men's debate into the realm of a progressive creed

… I fear that they who begin by excusing their ancestors may end by excusing themselves.

Perhaps as a continuation of his argument, in 1914, George Lincoln Burr published a large compilation "Narratives". This book arguably continues to be the single most cited reference on the subject. Unlike Poole and Upham, Burr avoids forwarding his previous debate with Kittredge directly into his book and mentions Kittredge only once, briefly in a footnote citing both of their essays from 1907 and 1911, but without further comment. But in addition to the viewpoint displayed by Burr's selections, he weighs in on the Poole vs Upham debate at various times, including siding with Upham in a note on Thomas Brattle's letter, "The strange suggestion of W. F. Poole that Brattle here means Cotton Mather himself, is adequately answered by Upham…" Burr's "Narratives" reprint a lengthy but abridged portion of Calef's book and introducing it he digs deep into the historical record for information on Calef and concludes "…that he had else any grievance against the Mathers or their colleagues there is no reason to think." Burr finds that a comparison between Calef's work and original documents in the historical record collections "testify to the care and exactness…"

20th century revision: The Kittredge lineage at Harvard
1920–3 Kenneth B. Murdock wrote a doctoral dissertation on Increase Mather advised by Chester Noyes Greenough and Kittredge. Murdock's father was a banker hired in 1920 to run the Harvard Press and he published his son's dissertation as a handsome volume in 1925: Increase Mather, The Foremost American Puritan (Harvard University Press). Kittredge was right hand man to the elder Murdock at the Press. This work focuses on Increase Mather and is more critical of the son, but the following year he published a selection of Cotton Mather's writings with an introduction that claims Cotton Mather was "not less but more humane than his contemporaries. Scholars have demonstrated that his advice to the witch judges was always that they should be more cautious in accepting evidence" against the accused. Murdock's statement seems to claim a majority view. But one wonders who Murdock would have meant by "scholars" at this time other than Poole, Kittredge, and TJ Holmes (below) and Murdock's obituary calls him a pioneer "in the reversal of a movement among historians of American culture to discredit the Puritan and colonial period…"

1924 Thomas J. Holmes was an Englishman with no college education, but he apprenticed in bookbinding and emigrated to the U.S. and became the librarian at the William G. Mather Library in Ohio where he likely met Murdock. In 1924, Holmes wrote an essay for the Bibliographical Society of America identifying himself as part of the Poole-Kittredge lineage and citing Kenneth B. Murdock's still unpublished dissertation. In 1932 Holmes published a bibliography of Increase Mather followed by Cotton Mather, A Bibliography (1940). Holmes often cites Murdock and Kittredge and is highly knowledgeable about the construction of books. Holmes' work also includes Cotton Mather's October 20, 1692 letter (see above) to his uncle opposing an end to the trials.

 1930 Samuel Eliot Morison published Builders of the Bay Colony. Morison chose not to include anyone with the surname Mather or Cotton in his collection of twelve "builders" and in the bibliography writes "I have a higher opinion than most historians of Cotton Mather's Magnalia… Although Mather is inaccurate, pedantic, and not above suppresio veri, he does succeed in giving a living picture of the person he writes about." Whereas Kittredge and Murdock worked from the English department, Morison was from Harvard's history department. Morison's view seems to have evolved over the course of the 1930s, as can be seen in Harvard College in the Seventeenth Century (1936) published while Kittredge ran the Harvard press, and in a year that coincided with the tercentary of the college: "Since the appearance of Professor Kittredge's work, it is not necessary to argue that a man of learning…" of that era should be judged on his view of witchcraft. In The Intellectual Life of Colonial New England (1956), Morison writes that Cotton Mather found balance and level-thinking during the witchcraft trials. Like Poole, Morison suggests Calef had an agenda against Mather, without providing supporting evidence.

1953 Perry Miller published The New England Mind: From Colony to Province (Belknap Press of Harvard University Press). Miller worked from the Harvard English Department and his expansive prose contains few citations, but the "Bibliographical Notes" for Chapter XIII "The Judgement of the Witches" references the bibliographies of TJ Holmes (above) calling Holmes portrayal of Cotton Mather's composition of Wonders "an epoch in the study of Salem Witchcraft." However, following the discovery of the authentic holograph of the September 2, 1692 letter, in 1985, David Levin writes that the letter demonstrates that the timeline employed by TJ Holmes and Perry Miller, is off by "three weeks." Contrary to the evidence in the later arriving letter, Miller portrays Phips and Stoughton as pressuring Cotton Mather to write the book (p.201): "If ever there was a false book produced by a man whose heart was not in it, it is The Wonders….he was insecure, frightened, sick at heart…" The book "has ever since scarred his reputation," Perry Miller writes. Miller seems to imagine Cotton Mather as sensitive, tender, and a good vehicle for his jeremiad thesis: "His mind was bubbling with every sentence of the jeremiads, for he was heart and soul in the effort to reorganize them.

1969 Chadwick Hansen Witchcraft at Salem. Hansen states a purpose to "set the record straight" and reverse the "traditional interpretation of what happened at Salem…" and names Poole and Kittredge as like-minded influences. (Hansen reluctantly keys his footnotes to Burr's anthology for the reader's convenience, "in spite of [Burr's] anti-Puritan bias…") Hansen presents Mather as a positive influence on the Salem Trials and considers Mather's handling of the Goodwin children sane and temperate. Hansen posits that Mather was a moderating influence by opposing the death penalty for those who confessed—or feigned confession—such as Tituba and Dorcas Good, and that most negative impressions of him stem from his "defense" of the ongoing trials in Wonders of the Invisible World. Writing an introduction to a facsimile of Robert Calef's book in 1972, Hansen compares Robert Calef to Joseph Goebbels, and also explains that, in Hansen's opinion, women "are more subject to hysteria than men."

1971 The Admirable Cotton Mather by James Playsted Wood. A young adult book. In the preface, Wood discusses the Harvard-based revision and writes that Kittredge and Murdock "added to a better understanding of a vital and courageous man…" 

1985 David Hall writes, "With [Kittredge] one great phase of interpretation came to a dead end." Hall writes that whether the old interpretation favored by "antiquarians" had begun with the "malice of Robert Calef or deep hostility to Puritanism," either way "such notions are no longer… the concern of the historian." But David Hall notes "one minor exception. Debate continues on the attitude and role of Cotton Mather…"

Tercentenary of the trials and ongoing scholarship
Toward the latter half of the twentieth century, a number of historians at universities far from New England seemed to find inspiration in the Kittredge lineage. In Selected Letters of Cotton Mather Ken Silverman writes, "Actually, Mather had very little to do with the trials." Twelve pages later Silverman publishes, for the first time, a letter to chief judge William Stoughton on September 2, 1692, in which Cotton Mather writes "… I hope I can may say that one half of my endeavors to serve you have not been told or seen … I have labored to divert the thoughts of my readers with something of a designed contrivance…"
Writing in the early 1980s, historian John Demos imputed to Mather a purportedly moderating influence on the trials.

Coinciding with the tercentenary of the trials in 1992, there was a flurry of publications.

Historian Larry Gregg highlights Mather's cloudy thinking and confusion between sympathy for the possessed, and the boundlessness of spectral evidence when Mather stated, "the devil have sometimes represented the shapes of persons not only innocent, but also the very virtuous."

Historical and theological writings 
Cotton Mather was an extremely prolific writer, producing 388 different books and pamphlets during his lifetime.  His most widely distributed work was Magnalia Christi Americana (which may be translated as "The Glorious Works of Christ in America"), subtitled "The ecclesiastical history of New England, from its first planting in the year 1620 unto the year of Our Lord 1698. In seven books."  Despite the Latin title, the work is written in English.  Mather began working on it towards the end of 1693 and it was finally published in London in 1702.  The work incorporates information that Mather put together from a variety of sources, such as letters, diaries, sermons, Harvard College records, personal conversations, and the manuscript histories composed by William Hubbard and William Bradford.  The Magnalia includes about fifty biographies of eminent New Englanders (ranging from John Eliot, the first Puritan missionary to the Native Americans, to Sir William Phips, the incumbent governor of Massachusetts at the time that Mather began writing), plus dozens of brief biographical sketches, including those of Hannah Duston and Hannah Swarton.

According to Kenneth Silverman, an expert on early American literature and Cotton Mather's biographer,

Silverman argues that, although Mather glorifies New England's Puritan past, in the Magnalia he also attempts to transcend the religious separatism of the old Puritan settlers, reflecting Mather's more ecumenical and cosmopolitan embrace of a Transatlantic Protestant Christianity that included, in addition to Mather's own Congregationalists, also Presbyterians, Baptists, and low church Anglicans.

In 1693 Mather also began work on a grand intellectual project that he titled Biblia Americana, which sought to provide a commentary and interpretation of the Christian Bible in light of "all of the Learning in the World".  Mather, who continued to work on it for many years, sought to incorporate into his reading of Scripture the new scientific knowledge and theories, including geography, heliocentrism, atomism, and Newtonianism.  According to Silverman, the project "looks forward to Mather's becoming probably the most influential spokesman in New England for a rationalized, scientized Christianity."  Mather could not find a publisher for the Biblia Americana, which remained in manuscript form during his lifetime.  It is currently being edited in ten volumes, published by Mohr Siebeck under the direction of Reiner Smolinski and Jan Stievermann.  As of 2023, seven of the ten volumes have appeared in print.

Conflict with Governor Dudley 
In Massachusetts at the start of the 18th century, Joseph Dudley was a highly controversial figure, as he had participated actively in the government of Sir Edmund Andros in 1686–1689.  Dudley was among those arrested in the revolt of 1689, and was later called to London to answer the charges against him brought by a committee of the colonists.  However, Dudley was able to pursue a successful political career in Britain.  Upon the death in 1701 of acting governor William Stoughton, Dudley began enlisting support in London to procure appointment as the new governor of Massachusetts. 

Although the Mathers (to whom he was related by marriage), continued to resent Dudley's role in the Andros administration, they eventually came around to the view that Dudley would now be preferable as governor to the available alternatives, at a time when the English Parliament was threatening to repeal the Massachusetts Charter.  With the Mathers' support, Dudley was appointed governor by the Crown and returned to Boston in 1702.  Contrary to the promises that he had made to the Mathers, Governor Dudley proved a divisive and high-handed executive, reserving his patronage for a small circle composed of transatlantic merchants, Anglicans, and religious liberals such as Thomas Brattle, Benjamin Colman, and John Leverett. 

In the context of Queen Anne's War (1702–1713), Cotton Mather preached and published against Governor Dudley, whom Mather accused of corruption and misgovernment.  Mather sought unsuccessfully to have Dudley replaced by Sir Charles Hobby.  Outmaneuvered by Dudley, this political rivalry left Mather increasingly isolated at a time when Massachusetts society was steadily moving away from the Puritan tradition that Mather represented.

Relationship with Harvard and Yale 

Cotton Mather was a fellow of Harvard College from 1690 to 1702, and at various times sat on its Board of Overseers.  His father Increase had succeeded John Rogers as president of Harvard in 1684, first as acting president (1684–1686), later with the title of "rector" (1686–1692, during much of which period he was away from Massachusetts, pleading the Puritans' case before the Royal Court in London), and finally with the full title of president (1692–1701).  Increase was unwilling to move permanently to the Harvard campus in Cambridge, Massachusetts, since his congregation in Boston was much larger than the Harvard student body, which at the time counted only a few dozen.  Instructed by a committee of the Massachusetts General Assembly that the president of Harvard had to reside in Cambridge and preach to the students in person, Increase resigned in 1701 and was replaced by the Rev. Samuel Willard as acting president.  

Cotton Mather sought the presidency of Harvard, but in 1708 the fellows instead appointed a layman, John Leverett, who had the support of Governor Dudley.  The Mathers disapproved of the increasing independence and liberalism of the Harvard faculty, which they regarded as laxity.  Cotton Mather came to see the Collegiate School, which had moved in 1716 from Saybrook to New Haven, Connecticut, as a better vehicle for preserving the Puritan orthodoxy in New England.  In 1718, Cotton convinced Boston-born British businessman Elihu Yale to make a charitable gift sufficient to ensure the school's survival.  It was also Mather who suggested that the school change its name to Yale College after it accepted that donation.

Cotton Mather sought the presidency of Harvard again after Leverett's death in 1724, but the fellows offered the position to the Rev. Joseph Sewall (son of Judge Samuel Sewall, who had repented publicly for his role in the Salem witch trials).  When Sewall turned it down, Mather once again hoped that he might get the appointment.  Instead, the fellows offered it to one of its own number, the Rev. Benjamin Coleman, an old rival of Mather.  When Coleman refused it, the presidency went finally to the Rev. Benjamin Wadsworth.

Advocacy for smallpox inoculation
The practice of smallpox inoculation (as distinguished from to the later practice of vaccination) was developed possibly in 8th-century India or 10th-century China and by the 17th-century had reached Turkey. It was also practiced in western Africa, but it is not known when it started there. Inoculation or, rather, variolation, involved infecting a person via a cut in the skin with exudate from a patient with a relatively mild case of smallpox (variola), to bring about a manageable and recoverable infection that would provide later immunity. By the beginning of the 18th century, the Royal Society in England was discussing the practice of inoculation, and the smallpox epidemic in 1713 spurred further interest. It was not until 1721, however, that England recorded its first case of inoculation.

Early New England
Smallpox was a serious threat in colonial America, most devastating to Native Americans, but also to Anglo-American settlers. New England suffered smallpox epidemics in 1677, 1689–90, and 1702. It was highly contagious, and mortality could reach as high as 30 percent. Boston had been plagued by smallpox outbreaks in 1690 and 1702. During this era, public authorities in Massachusetts dealt with the threat primarily by means of quarantine. Incoming ships were quarantined in Boston Harbor, and any smallpox patients in town were held under guard or in a "pesthouse".

In 1716, Onesimus, one of Mather's slaves, explained to Mather how he had been inoculated as a child in Africa. Mather was fascinated by the idea. By July 1716, he had read an endorsement of inoculation by Dr Emanuel Timonius of Constantinople in the Philosophical Transactions. Mather then declared, in a letter to Dr John Woodward of Gresham College in London, that he planned to press Boston's doctors to adopt the practice of inoculation should smallpox reach the colony again.

By 1721, a whole generation of young Bostonians was vulnerable and memories of the last epidemic's horrors had by and large disappeared. Smallpox returned on April 22 of that year, when HMS Seahorse arrived from the West Indies carrying smallpox on board. Despite attempts to protect the town through quarantine, nine known cases of smallpox appeared in Boston by May 27, and by mid-June, the disease was spreading at an alarming rate. As a new wave of smallpox hit the area and continued to spread, many residents fled to outlying rural settlements. The combination of exodus, quarantine, and outside traders' fears disrupted business in the capital of the Bay Colony for weeks. Guards were stationed at the House of Representatives to keep Bostonians from entering without special permission. The death toll reached 101 in September, and the Selectmen, powerless to stop it, "severely limited the length of time funeral bells could toll." As one response, legislators delegated a thousand pounds from the treasury to help the people who, under these conditions, could no longer support their families.

On June 6, 1721, Mather sent an abstract of reports on inoculation by Timonius and Jacobus Pylarinus to local physicians, urging them to consult about the matter. He received no response. Next, Mather pleaded his case to Dr. Zabdiel Boylston, who tried the procedure on his youngest son and two slaves—one grown and one a boy. All recovered in about a week. Boylston inoculated seven more people by mid-July. The epidemic peaked in October 1721, with 411 deaths; by February 26, 1722, Boston was again free from smallpox. The total number of cases since April 1721 came to 5,889, with 844 deaths—more than three-quarters of all the deaths in Boston during 1721. Meanwhile, Boylston had inoculated 287 people, with six resulting deaths.

Inoculation debate
Boylston and Mather's inoculation crusade "raised a horrid Clamour" among the people of Boston. Both Boylston and Mather were "Object[s] of their Fury; their furious Obloquies and Invectives", which Mather acknowledges in his diary. Boston's Selectmen, consulting a doctor who claimed that the practice caused many deaths and only spread the infection, forbade Boylston from performing it again.

The New-England Courant published writers who opposed the practice. The editorial stance was that the Boston populace feared that inoculation spread, rather than prevented, the disease; however, some historians, notably H. W. Brands, have argued that this position was a result of the contrarian positions of editor-in-chief James Franklin (a brother of Benjamin Franklin). Public discourse ranged in tone from organized arguments by John Williams from Boston, who posted that "several arguments proving that inoculating the smallpox is not contained in the law of Physick, either natural or divine, and therefore unlawful", to those put forth in a pamphlet by Dr. William Douglass of Boston, entitled The Abuses and Scandals of Some Late Pamphlets in Favour of Inoculation of the Small Pox (1721), on the qualifications of inoculation's proponents. (Douglass was exceptional at the time for holding a medical degree from Europe.) At the extreme, in November 1721, someone hurled a lighted grenade into Mather's home.

Medical opposition
Several opponents of smallpox inoculation, among them John Williams, stated that there were only two laws of physick (medicine): sympathy and antipathy. In his estimation, inoculation was neither a sympathy toward a wound or a disease, or an antipathy toward one, but the creation of one. For this reason, its practice violated the natural laws of medicine, transforming health care practitioners into those who harm rather than heal.

As with most colonists, Williams' Puritan beliefs were enmeshed in every aspect of his life, and he used the Bible to state his case. He quoted Matthew 9:12, when Jesus said: "It is not the healthy who need a doctor, but the sick." William Douglass proposed a more secular argument against inoculation, stressing the importance of reason over passion and urging the public to be pragmatic in their choices. In addition, he demanded that ministers leave the practice of medicine to physicians, and not meddle in areas where they lacked expertise. According to Douglass, smallpox inoculation was "a medical experiment of consequence," one not to be undertaken lightly. He believed that not all learned individuals were qualified to doctor others, and while ministers took on several roles in the early years of the colony, including that of caring for the sick, they were now expected to stay out of state and civil affairs. Douglass felt that inoculation caused more deaths than it prevented. The only reason Mather had had success in it, he said, was because Mather had used it on children, who are naturally more resilient. Douglass vowed to always speak out against "the wickedness of spreading infection". Speak out he did: "The battle between these two prestigious adversaries [Douglass and Mather] lasted far longer than the epidemic itself, and the literature accompanying the controversy was both vast and venomous."

Puritan resistance
Generally, Puritan pastors favored the inoculation experiments. Increase Mather, Cotton's father, was joined by prominent pastors Benjamin Colman and William Cooper in openly propagating the use of inoculations. "One of the classic assumptions of the Puritan mind was that the will of God was to be discerned in nature as well as in revelation." Nevertheless, Williams questioned whether the smallpox "is not one of the strange works of God; and whether inoculation of it be not a fighting with the most High." He also asked his readers if the smallpox epidemic may have been given to them by God as "punishment for sin," and warned that attempting to shield themselves from God's fury (via inoculation), would only serve to "provoke him more".

Puritans found meaning in affliction, and they did not yet know why God was showing them disfavor through smallpox. Not to address their errant ways before attempting a cure could set them back in their "errand". Many Puritans believed that creating a wound and inserting poison was doing violence and therefore was antithetical to the healing art. They grappled with adhering to the Ten Commandments, with being proper church members and good caring neighbors. The apparent contradiction between harming or murdering a neighbor through inoculation and the Sixth Commandment—"thou shalt not kill"—seemed insoluble and hence stood as one of the main objections against the procedure. Williams maintained that because the subject of inoculation could not be found in the Bible, it was not the will of God, and therefore "unlawful." He explained that inoculation violated The Golden Rule, because if one neighbor voluntarily infected another with disease, he was not doing unto others as he would have done to him. With the Bible as the Puritans' source for all decision-making, lack of scriptural evidence concerned many, and Williams vocally scorned Mather for not being able to reference an inoculation edict directly from the Bible.

Inoculation defended
With the smallpox epidemic catching speed and racking up a staggering death toll, a solution to the crisis was becoming more urgently needed by the day. The use of quarantine and various other efforts, such as balancing the body's humors, did not slow the spread of the disease. As news rolled in from town to town and correspondence arrived from overseas, reports of horrific stories of suffering and loss due to smallpox stirred mass panic among the people. "By circa 1700, smallpox had become among the most devastating of epidemic diseases circulating in the Atlantic world."

Mather strongly challenged the perception that inoculation was against the will of God and argued the procedure was not outside of Puritan principles. He wrote that "whether a Christian may not employ this Medicine (let the matter of it be what it will) and humbly give Thanks to God's good Providence in discovering of it to a miserable World; and humbly look up to His Good Providence (as we do in the use of any other Medicine) It may seem strange, that any wise Christian cannot answer it. And how strangely do Men that call themselves Physicians betray their Anatomy, and their Philosophy, as well as their Divinity in their invectives against this Practice?" The Puritan minister began to embrace the sentiment that smallpox was an inevitability for anyone, both the good and the wicked, yet God had provided them with the means to save themselves. Mather reported that, from his view, "none that have used it ever died of the Small Pox, tho at the same time, it were so malignant, that at least half the People died, that were infected With it in the Common way."

While Mather was experimenting with the procedure, prominent Puritan pastors Benjamin Colman and William Cooper expressed public and theological support for them. The practice of smallpox inoculation was eventually accepted by the general population due to first-hand experiences and personal relationships. Although many were initially wary of the concept, it was because people were able to witness the procedure's consistently positive results, within their own community of ordinary citizens, that it became widely utilized and supported. One important change in the practice after 1721 was regulated quarantine of innoculees.

The aftermath
Although Mather and Boylston were able to demonstrate the efficacy of the practice, the debate over inoculation would continue even beyond the epidemic of 1721–22.  After overcoming considerable difficulty and achieving notable success, Boylston traveled to London in 1725, where he published his results and was elected to the Royal Society in 1726, with Mather formally receiving the honor two years prior.

Other scientific work

In 1716, Mather used different varieties of maize ("Indian corn") to conduct one of the first recorded experiments on plant hybridization. He described the results in a letter to his friend James Petiver:

In his Curiosa Americana (1712–1724) collection, Mather also announced that flowering plants reproduce sexually, an observation that later became the basis of the Linnaean system of plant classification.  Mather may also have been the first to develop the concept of genetic dominance, which later would underpin Mendelian genetics.

In 1713, the Secretary of the Royal Society of London, naturalist Richard Waller, informed Mather that he had been elected as a fellow of the Society.  Mather was the eighth colonial American to join that learned body, with the first having been John Winthrop the Younger in 1662.  During the controversies surrounding Mather's smallpox inoculation campaign of 1721, his adversaries questioned that credential on the grounds that Mather's name did not figure in the published lists of the Society's members.  At the time, the Society responded that those published lists included only members who had been inducted in person and who were therefore entitled to vote in the Society's yearly elections.  In May 1723, Mather's correspondent John Woodward discovered that, although Mather had been duly nominated in 1713, approved by the council, and informed by Waller of his election at that time, due to an oversight the nomination had not in fact been voted upon by the full assembly of fellows or the vote had not been recorded.  After Woodward informed the Society of the situation, the members proceeded to elect Mather by a formal vote.

Mather's enthusiasm for experimental science was strongly influenced by his reading of Robert Boyle's work.  Mather was a significant popularizer of the new scientific knowledge and promoted Copernican heliocentrism in some of his sermons.  He also argued against the spontaneous generation of life and compiled a medical manual titled The Angel of Bethesda that he hoped would assist people who were unable to procure the services of a physician, but which went unpublished in Mather's lifetime.  This was the only comprehensive medical work written in colonial English-speaking America.  Although much of what Mather included in that manual were folk remedies now regarded as unscientific or superstitious, some of them are still valid, including smallpox inoculation and the use of citrus juice to treat scurvy.  Mather also outlined an early form of germ theory and discussed psychogenic diseases, while recommending hygiene, physical exercise, temperate diet, and avoidance of tobacco smoking.

In his later years, Mather also promoted the professionalization of scientific research in America.  He presented a Boston tradesman named Grafton Feveryear with the barometer that Feveryear used to make the first quantitative meteorological observations in New England, which he communicated to the Royal Society in 1727.  Mather also sponsored Isaac Greenwood, a Harvard graduate and member of Mather's church, who travelled to London and collaborated with the Royal Society's curator of experiments, John Theophilus Desaguliers.  Greenwood later became the first Hollis professor of mathematics and natural philosophy at Harvard, and may well have been the first American to practice science professionally.

Slavery and racial attitudes

Cotton Mather's household included both free servants and a number of slaves who performed domestic chores.  Surviving records indicate that, over the course of his lifetime, Mather owned at least three, and probably more, slaves.  Like the vast majority of Christians at the time, but unlike his political rival Judge Samuel Sewall, Mather was never an abolitionist, although he did publicly denounce what he regarded as the illegal and inhuman aspects of the burgeoning Atlantic slave trade.  In his book The Negro Christianized (1706), Mather insisted that slaveholders should treat their black slaves humanely and instruct them in Christianity with a view to promoting their salvation.  Mather received black members of his congregation in his home and he paid a schoolteacher to instruct local black people in reading.

Mather consistently held that black Africans were "of one Blood" with the rest of mankind and that blacks and whites would meet as equals in Heaven.  After a number of black people carried out arson attacks in Boston in 1723, Mather asked the outraged white Bostonians whether the black population had been "always treated according to the Rules of Humanity?  Are they treated as those, that are of one Blood with us, and those who have Immortal Souls in them, and are not mere Beasts of Burden?"

Mather advocated the Christianization of black slaves both on religious grounds and as tending to make them more patient and faithful servants of their masters.  In The Negro Christianized, Mather argued against the opinion of Richard Baxter that a Christian could not enslave another baptized Christian.  The African slave Onesimus, from whom Mather first learned about smallpox inoculation, had been purchased for him as a gift by his congregation in 1706.  Despite his efforts, Mather was unable to convert Onesimus to Christianity and finally manumitted him in 1716.

Sermons against pirates and piracy
Throughout his career Mather was also keen to minister to convicted pirates. He produced a number of pamphlets and sermons concerning piracy, including Faithful Warnings to prevent Fearful Judgments; Instructions to the Living, from the Condition of the Dead; The Converted Sinner ... A Sermon Preached in Boston, May 31, 1724, In the Hearing and at the Desire of certain Pirates; A Brief Discourse occasioned by a Tragical Spectacle of a Number of Miserables under Sentence of Death for Piracy; Useful Remarks. An Essay upon Remarkables in the Way of Wicked Men and The Vial Poured Out Upon the Sea. His father Increase had preached at the trial of Dutch pirate Peter Roderigo; Cotton Mather in turn preached at the trials and sometimes executions of pirate Captains (or the crews of) William Fly, John Quelch, Samuel Bellamy, William Kidd, Charles Harris, and John Phillips. He also ministered to Thomas Hawkins, Thomas Pound, and William Coward; having been convicted of piracy, they were jailed alongside "Mary Glover the Irish Catholic witch," daughter of witch "Goody" Ann Glover at whose trial Mather had also preached.

In his conversations with William Fly and his crew Mather scolded them: "You have something within you, that will compell you to confess, That the Things which you have done, are most Unreasonable and Abominable. The Robberies and Piracies, you have committed, you can say nothing to Justify them.  …  It is a most hideous Article in the Heap of Guilt lying on you, that an Horrible Murder is charged upon you; There is a cry of Blood going up to Heaven against you."

Death and place of burial 

Cotton Mather was twice widowed, and only two of his 15 children survived him.  He died on the day after his 65th birthday and was buried on Copp's Hill Burying Ground, in Boston's North End.

Works
Mather was a prolific writer and industrious in having his works printed, including a vast number of his sermons.

Major
 Memorable Providences (1689) his first full book, on the subject of witchcraft
 Wonders of the Invisible World (1692) his second major book, also on witchcraft, sent to London in October, 1692
 Pillars of Salt (1699)
 Magnalia Christi Americana (1702)
 The Negro Christianized (1706)
 Corderius Americanus: A Discourse on the Good Education of Children (1708)
 Bonifacius (1710)

Pillars of Salt
Mather's first published sermon, printed in 1686, concerned the execution of James Morgan, convicted of murder. Thirteen years later, Mather published the sermon in a compilation, along with other similar works, called Pillars of Salt.

Magnalia Christi Americana
Magnalia Christi Americana, considered Mather's greatest work, was published in 1702, when he was 39. The book includes several biographies of saints and describes the process of the New England settlement. In this context "saints" does not refer to the canonized saints of the Catholic church, but to those Puritan divines about whom Mather is writing. It comprises seven total books, including Pietas in Patriam: The life of His Excellency Sir William Phips, originally published anonymously in London in 1697. Despite being one of Mather's best-known works, some have openly criticized it, labeling it as hard to follow and understand, and poorly paced and organized. However, other critics have praised Mather's work, citing it as one of the best efforts at properly documenting the establishment of America and growth of the people.

The Christian Philosopher
In 1721, Mather published The Christian Philosopher, the first systematic book on science published in America. Mather attempted to show how Newtonian science and religion were in harmony. It was in part based on Robert Boyle's The Christian Virtuoso (1690). Mather reportedly took inspiration from Hayy ibn Yaqdhan, by the 12th-century Islamic philosopher Abu Bakr Ibn Tufail.

Despite condemning the "Mahometans" as infidels, Mather viewed the novel's protagonist, Hayy, as a model for his ideal Christian philosopher and monotheistic scientist. Mather viewed Hayy as a noble savage and applied this in the context of attempting to understand the Native American Indians, in order to convert them to Puritan Christianity. Mather's short treatise on the Lord's Supper was later translated by his cousin Josiah Cotton.

In popular culture
The rock band Cotton Mather is named after Mather.

The Handsome Family's 2006 album Last Days of Wonder is named in reference to Mather's 1693 book Wonders of the Invisible World, which lyricist Rennie Sparks found intriguing because of what she called its "madness brimming under the surface of things."

One of the stories in Richard Brautigan′s collection Revenge of the Lawn is called ″1692 Cotton Mather Newsreel″.

Seth Gabel portrays Cotton Mather in the TV series Salem, which aired from 2014 to 2017.

See also

 John Ratcliff

References
Notes

References

Further reading

External links

 
 Salem Witchcraft and Cotton Mather by Charles Wentworth Upham at Project Gutenberg
 
 
 Cotton Mather's writings
 Mather's influential commentary, collegiateway.org
 The Wonders of the Invisible World (1693 edition) (PDF format)
 The Threefold Paradise of Cotton Mather: An Edition of "Triparadisus" (PDF format)
 Cotton Mather's "~Resolved~", A Puritan Father's Lesson Plan, neprimer.com
 Cotton Mather's "The Story of Margaret Rule", bartleby.com

1663 births
1728 deaths
17th-century American philosophers
17th-century American writers
17th-century apocalypticists
17th-century Calvinist and Reformed theologians
17th-century Christian clergy
17th-century male writers
17th-century New England Puritan ministers
18th-century American philosophers
18th-century American writers
18th-century apocalypticists
18th-century Calvinist and Reformed theologians
18th-century Christian clergy
18th-century New England Puritan ministers
Alumni of the University of Glasgow
American Calvinist and Reformed theologians
American colonial clergy
American people of English descent
American religious writers
American sermon writers
American evangelicals
Boston Latin School alumni
Burials in Boston
Christianity in the early modern period
Demonologists
Early Modern period

Fellows of the Royal Society
Harvard College alumni
History of religion in the United States
Massachusetts colonial-era clergy
Mather family
People from colonial Boston
People from North End, Boston
People of the Salem witch trials
Philosophers of science
Witch hunters
Writers from Boston
Yale University people
American slave owners
Witch trials in North America